Serge Melfinn Kats (born 9 September 1971 in Rotterdam) is a sailor from the Netherlands, who represented his country for the first time at the 1996 Summer Olympics  in Savannah. There he took the 13th place in the Laser. Kats second and final Olympic appearance was during the 2000 Olympics in Sydney. In this competition Kats took the 4th place, again in the Laser.

Nowadays Kats is Manager Topsport at the Koninklijk Nederlands Watersport Verbond.

References

External links
 
 
 

Living people
1971 births
Sportspeople from Rotterdam
Dutch male sailors (sport)
Dutch windsurfers
Sailors at the 1996 Summer Olympics – Laser
Sailors at the 2000 Summer Olympics – Laser
Olympic sailors of the Netherlands
Optimist class world champions
Flying Dutchman class sailors
Star class sailors
Europe class world champions
World champions in sailing for the Netherlands
20th-century Dutch people